Manuela Montebrun (born 13 November 1979) is a retired, female hammer thrower from France. She is an Olympic bronze medallist and two-time World Championship bronze medallist.

Career
Born in Laval, Mayenne, Montebrun won two back-to-back World Championship bronze medals in 2003 and 2005. She had finished fourth in the final of the 2005 World Championships, but was belatedly awarded the bronze medal in 2013 when the 2005 World Championships gold medallist Olga Kuzenkova was stripped of her gold medal for doping.

Montebrun's outdoor, personal best throw is 74.66 metres, achieved on 11 July 2005 in Zagreb, Croatia.

Montebrun retired from athletics in June 2012.

Originally fifth in the 2008 Olympic final, Montebrun was promoted to the bronze medal position in 2016, after the drugs disqualifications of Aksana Miankova and Darya Pchelnik.

Results in international competitions
Note: Only the position and distance in the final are indicated, unless otherwise stated. If the athlete did not qualify for the final, the overall position and distance in the qualification round are indicated.

References

1979 births
Living people
French female hammer throwers
Athletes (track and field) at the 2000 Summer Olympics
Athletes (track and field) at the 2004 Summer Olympics
Athletes (track and field) at the 2008 Summer Olympics
Olympic bronze medalists for France
Olympic athletes of France
People from Laval, Mayenne
World Athletics Championships medalists
European Athletics Championships medalists
Universiade medalists in athletics (track and field)
Goodwill Games medalists in athletics
Sportspeople from Mayenne
Universiade gold medalists for France
Universiade bronze medalists for France
Knights of the Ordre national du Mérite
World Athletics Championships athletes for France
Medalists at the 2001 Summer Universiade
Competitors at the 2001 Goodwill Games